Handcuffs (Lisice) is a Croatian film directed by Krsto Papić. It was released in Yugoslavia in 1969.

In 1999, a poll of Croatian film critics found it to be one of the best Croatian films ever made.

Cast 
 Fabijan Šovagović - Ante
 Adem Čejvan - Andrija
 Jagoda Kaloper - Višnja
 Ilija Ivezić - Krešo
 Fahro Konjhodžić - Ćazim
 Ivica Vidović - Musa
 Edo Peročević - Baletić
 Zaim Muzaferija - Todor
 Zlatko Madunić
 Rikard Brzeska  
 Branko Špoljar - Učitelj

References

External links
 

1969 drama films
1969 films
1960s Croatian-language films
Films directed by Krsto Papić
Jadran Film films
Croatian drama films
Croatian black-and-white films
Films set in 1948
Yugoslav drama films